Harry Cullum (29 August 1929 – 9 August 2004) was a British sports shooter. He competed at the 1964 Summer Olympics and the 1972 Summer Olympics.

References

1929 births
2004 deaths
British male sport shooters
Olympic shooters of Great Britain
Shooters at the 1964 Summer Olympics
Shooters at the 1972 Summer Olympics
People from Loddon
20th-century British people